Ocean One may refer to:
Ocean One (Hong Kong), mixed commercial–residential property in Yau Tong, Hong Kong
Ocean One (Panama City), residential building in Costa del Este, Panama City, Panama
Ocean 1 Tower, proposed skyscraper in Pattaya, Thailand